The Men's time trial of the 2009 UCI Road World Championships cycling event took place on 24 September in Mendrisio, Switzerland.

Starting order

Final classification (top 30)

References

Men's time trial
UCI Road World Championships – Men's time trial